The Scranton/Wilkes-Barre Steamers were a Premier Basketball League (PBL) team who played during the 2012 season. Based in Scranton, Pennsylvania, the Steamers played their home games at the Student Union Center on the campus of Lackawanna College. In their only season, the Steamers finished 2nd in their division with a 10-10 record, clinching a playoff berth. In the first round of the playoffs, the Steamers were matched up against the Central Illinois Drive of the Central Division. The Steamers were swept by the Drive, 2 games to 0 in the best of three series.

External links
Scranton/Wilkes-Barre Steamers website
Official PBL press release announcing team

Former Premier Basketball League teams
Sports in the Scranton–Wilkes-Barre metropolitan area
Basketball teams in Pennsylvania
Basketball teams established in 2011
2011 establishments in Pennsylvania
Sports clubs disestablished in 2012
2012 disestablishments in Pennsylvania